The Lion Hunt is a 1621 painting by Peter Paul Rubens, now held in the Alte Pinakothek in Munich. It shows two lions attacked by hunters on horseback and on foot. It marks the end of an intensive creative phase for Rubens centered on the theme of hunting. It has the dimensions of 377 by 249 cm (148,2 x 97,9 inches)

Related subjects by Rubens

Bibliography
Arnout Balis, Hunting Scenes, vol. 2, Oxford University Press and Harvey Miller Ltd, coll. Corpus Rubenianum Ludwig Burchard, 1986, 406 p. (lire en ligne), partie XVIII
David Rosand, ‘Rubens's Munich Lion Hunt: Its Sources and Significance’, The Art Bulletin, College Art Association, vol. 51, no. 1, March 1969, pp. 29–40

1621 paintings
Paintings by Peter Paul Rubens
Collection of the Alte Pinakothek
Lions in art
Horses in art
Hunting in art
Paintings about death